"Joy" is a song by English indie pop band Bastille. It was released on 2 May 2019 as the third single from their third studio album, Doom Days (2019). The song was written by Dan Smith, who handled the production along with Mark Crew and Daniel Priddy.  The song features backing vocals from singer Bim Amoako.

Live performances
On 7 June 2019, Bastille performed the song on The Graham Norton Show.

Music video
A music video to accompany the release of "Joy" was first released onto YouTube on 30 May 2019 at a total length of three minutes and twenty seconds. In a press release, Smith said, "This video looks at the things that bring us joy, when we think no one's looking. Things that are done secretly, maybe compulsively, that we wouldn't want other people to see. What seems strange and unthinkable to one person might bring pleasure to someone else. It’s fascinating that most people have a version of themselves they want to show in public – at work or online – and a version they don’t. We wanted to show it all."

Charts

Weekly charts

Year-end charts

Certifications

References

2019 songs
2019 singles
Bastille (band) songs
Songs written by Dan Smith (singer)